Norwegian-American Historical Association is a non-profit, member-supported organization dedicated to locating, collecting, preserving and interpreting the Norwegian-American experience. It publishes scholarly books and maintains a historical archive, documenting research and interpretations of the American experience of immigrants from Norway.

History
On 4th day of February, 1926, the Norwegian-American Historical Association was incorporated by Knut Gjerset, Birger Osland, and O. E. Rolvaag.  The organization was founded at St. Olaf College, in Northfield, Minnesota. Although the association is still located on the campus of St. Olaf, both institutions are independent entities.

Theodore C. Blegen served as managing editor for publications from 1925 until his retirement in 1960. His devotion to high standards of historical scholarship enabled the Norwegian-American Historical Association to achieve a reputation as a learned society. Later editors have included Kenneth O. Bjork from 1960 until 1980 and  Odd S. Lovoll from 1980 until 2001.

Ole E. Rolvaag, the author of Giants in the Earth, became the association's first secretary and archivist. Rolvaag initiated the collection of archives including letters, papers, books, periodicals, photographs, diaries and newspapers related to Norwegian-American life.

The association promotes Norwegian-American historical research and literary work; and helps maintain and develop archives of Norwegian-American historical material. Its Norwegian-American Studies publications are available online. The current editor of NAHA's publications is Anna Peterson. The association has enjoyed success and gained the recognition and respect of an international scholarly community.

In fulfillment of its purpose, the association has published nearly one hundred books of scholarly merit; promoted Norwegian-American historical research and literary work and preserved of materials of historical significance.

References and notes

External links
 Norwegian-American Historic Association official website
"Norwegian-American Studies" journal via University of Minnesota Press
Sogn og Fjordane - Norwegian-American Historical Association
King Olav V Chair in Scandinavian-American Studies at St. Olaf’s College

Historical societies of the United States
1925 establishments in Minnesota
Norwegian migration to North America
Norwegian-American culture in Minnesota
Organizations established in 1925